The 2018 CAF Champions League qualifying rounds were played from 10 February to 18 March 2018. A total of 59 teams competed in the qualifying rounds to decide the 16 places in the group stage of the 2018 CAF Champions League.

Draw

The draw for the preliminary round and first round was held on 13 December 2017 at the CAF headquarters in Cairo, Egypt.

The entry round of the 59 teams entered into the draw was determined by their performances in the CAF competitions for the previous five seasons (CAF 5-Year Ranking points shown in parentheses).

Format

In the qualifying rounds, each tie was played on a home-and-away two-legged basis. If the aggregate score was tied after the second leg, the away goals rule would be applied, and if still tied, extra time would not be played, and the penalty shoot-out would be used to determine the winner (Regulations III. 13 & 14).

Schedule
The schedule of each round was as follows (matches scheduled in midweek in italics).

Bracket
The bracket of the draw was announced by the CAF on 13 December 2017.

The 16 winners of the first round advanced to the group stage, while the 16 losers of the first round entered the Confederation Cup play-off round.

Preliminary round
The preliminary round included the 54 teams that did not receive byes to the first round.

|}

Saint George won on walkover after Al-Salam Wau failed to arrive for the first leg.

2–2 on aggregate. KCCA won on away goals.

Zanaco won 6–1 on aggregate.

5–5 on aggregate. Mbabane Swallows won on away goals.

Williamsville AC won 2–1 on aggregate.

Aduana Stars won 2–1 on aggregate.

ES Sétif won 6–0 on aggregate.

CF Mounana won 2–1 on aggregate.

MFM won 2–1 on aggregate.

MC Alger won 9–2 on aggregate.

Horoya won 3–1 on aggregate.

Génération Foot won 2–0 on aggregate.

Young Africans won 2–1 on aggregate.

Township Rollers won 4–2 on aggregate.

Gor Mahia won 3–1 on aggregate.

Espérance de Tunis won 6–1 on aggregate.

Plateau United won 4–0 on aggregate.

3–3 on aggregate. AS Togo-Port won 4–3 on penalties.

Al-Hilal won 3–1 on aggregate.

ZESCO United won 7–0 on aggregate.

ASEC Mimosas won 4–3 on aggregate.

UD Songo won 3–1 on aggregate.

Difaâ El Jadidi won 10–0 on aggregate.

AS Vita Club won 6–1 on aggregate.

1º de Agosto won 5–1 on aggregate.

Bidvest Wits won 2–1 on aggregate.

Rayon Sports won 2–1 on aggregate.

First round
The first round included 32 teams: the 27 winners of the preliminary round, and the 5 teams that received byes to this round.

|}

KCCA won 1–0 on aggregate

Mbabane Swallows won 3–1 on aggregate.

Wydad AC won 7–4 on aggregate.

ES Sétif won 4–1 on aggregate.

Al-Ahly won 7–1 on aggregate.

MC Alger won 7–2 on aggregate.

Horoya won 4–1 on aggregate.

Township Rollers won 2–1 on aggregate.

Espérance de Tunis won 1–0 on aggregate.

Étoile du Sahel won 4–3 on aggregate.

3–3 on aggregate. AS Togo-Port won on away goals.

2–2 on aggregate. ZESCO United won on away goals.

TP Mazembe won 4–3 on aggregate.

Difaâ El Jadidi won 3–2 on aggregate.

1–1 on aggregate. 1º de Agosto won 3–2 on penalties.

Mamelodi Sundowns won 2–0 on aggregate.

Notes

References

External links
22nd Edition Of Total CAF Champions League, CAFonline.com

1
February 2018 sports events in Africa
March 2018 sports events in Africa